Halysites (meaning chain coral) is an extinct genus of tabulate coral. Colonies range from less than one to tens of centimeters in diameter, and they fed upon plankton.

These tabulate corals lived from the Ordovician to the Devonian (from 449.5 to 412.3 Ma). Fossils of Halysites species have been found in the sediments of North America, Europe, Asia and Australia.

Species
Species in the genus Halysites include:
 Halysites catenularia Linnaeus, 1767
 Halysites encrustans Buehler
 Halysites grandis Sharkova, 1981
 Halysites infundibuliformis Buehler
 Halysites junior Klaamann, 1961
 Halysites louisvillensis Stumm
 Halysites meandrina Troost
 Halysites magnitubus Buehler
 Halysites priscus Klaamann, 1966
 Halysites regularis Fischer-Benzon, 1871
 Halysites senior Klaamann, 1961

References

Tabulata
Prehistoric Hexacorallia genera
Fossil taxa described in 1828
Late Ordovician first appearances
Silurian extinctions
Fossils of Australia
Fossils of Belarus
Fossils of Canada
Fossils of China
Fossils of the Czech Republic
Fossils of Estonia
Fossils of India
Fossils of Kazakhstan
Fossils of Latvia
Fossils of Lithuania
Fossils of Mongolia
Fossils of Norway
Fossils of Russia
Fossils of Sweden
Fossils of Turkey
Fossils of Ukraine
Fossils of Great Britain
Fossils of the United States
Fossils of Uzbekistan
Paleozoic life of Ontario
Paleozoic life of British Columbia
Paleozoic life of Manitoba
Paleozoic life of New Brunswick
Paleozoic life of the Northwest Territories
Paleozoic life of Nunavut
Paleozoic life of Quebec